The Darwin Hottest Sevens, known as the Hottest 7s in the World or the Hottest 7s, is a rugby sevens tournament held annually in Darwin, Australia on a weekend in early October. The event is sponsored by Heineken and is hosted by the Northern Territory Rugby Union. The tournament draws club teams and national teams from many countries around the world, including New Zealand, Papua New Guinea, Fiji, Samoa, England, Singapore, Malaysia, Japan and Australia.

The competition began in 1989, as the Territory Sevens, with the inaugural event being won by Fijian team, Duavata. The tournament was re-branded as the Hottest 7s in 2005, and has been supported by the Northern Territory Government since 2009. The organisers in 2013 claimed it was the richest rugby sevens tournament in the Southern Hemisphere with a prize pool of $65,000. The tournament was cancelled in 2020, but returned in 2021.

Format
The tournament attracts around forty to fifty teams each year. As of 2014, there were thirty-two men's teams and eight women's teams.

In the men's competition the top eight teams are seeded and eight pools of four teams each are drawn, with each team playing all others in their pool once. The top two teams from each pool advance to the Cup/Plate bracket, and the bottom two teams from each group enter the Bowl/Shield bracket. There are quarter-finals, semi-finals and finals matches in each bracket to decide the winners of the Croc Cup, Buff Plate, Barra Bowl, and Gecko Shield trophies.

For the women's competition, two pools of four teams each are drawn, with each team playing all others in their pool once to determine the seedings for the finals matches. There are quarter-finals, semi-finals and a final to decide the winner of the Jabiriu Cup.

Winners
The Hottest Sevens tournament trophy winners are listed below (results from 1989 to 2004 are for the Territory Sevens):

Croc Cup competition
 2022 – Tabadamu (Fiji)
 2021 – Tabadamu (Fiji)
 2020 – not contested
 2019 – Miwatj Stallions
 2018 – Borneo Eagles
 2017 – Darwin Stallions (NZ)
 2016 – Tabadamu (Fiji) 
 2015 – Borneo Eagles
 2014 – Hong Kong
 2013 – Auckland
 2012 – Borneo Eagles
 2011 – Borneo Eagles
 2010 – Borneo Eagles
 2009 – Samoa Barbarians
 2008 – South Sea Drifters (Fiji)
 2007 – South Sea Drifters (Fiji)
 2006 – Fiji Barbarians
 2005 – Aussie Spirit
 2004 – Darwin Dingoes
 2003 – Potoroos
 2002 – Hong Kong
 2001 – NZ Batt 3
 2000 – Fiji Services
 1999 – Darwin Dingoes
 1998 – Potoroos
 1997 – Potoroos
 1996 – Burnside
 1995 – Sydney University
 1994 – Duavata
 1993 – Hong Kong
 1992 – Duavata
 1991 – Sydney University
 1990 – AIS
 1989 – Duavata

Buff Plate competition
 2022 – Pristine Warriors
 2021 – Strait Balas 7s
 2020 – not contested
 2019 – Western Sydney Two Blues
 2018 – Darwin Stallions (NZ)

 2016 – Brisbane Fiji 
 2015 – NT Mosquitos
 2014 – Country King Browns
 2013 – Papua New Guinea
 2012 – NT Mosquitos
 2011 – Western Wolfpack
 2010 – NT Mosquitos
 2009 – Randwick
 2008 – NT Mosquitos
 2007 – Adelaide Black Falcons
 2006 – Aussie Legends
 2005 – Potoroos
 2004 – Burnside
 2003 – Casuarina
 2002 – South Darwin
 2001 – South Darwin
 2000 – University Pirates
 1999 – Albatross
 1998 – Aussie Signs
 1997 – South Darwin
 1996 – Palmerston Crocs
 1995 – HMAS Albatross
 1994 – Bayside
 1993 – RSL Dragons
 1992 – Singapore Cricket Club
 1991 – Singapore Cricket Club
 1990 – Crocs
 1989 – Phantoms

Barra Bowl competition
 2022 – Northern Marlins
 2021 – East Arnhem
 2020 – not contested
 2019 – Casuarina Cougars
 2018 – Gumatji Cavaliers
 2017 – Narraro (Fiji)
 2016 – Burnside (Adelaide)
 2015 – Noosa Dolphins
 2014 – Southern Lions
 2013 – East Arnhem 
 2012 – Bungendore Mudchooks
 2011 – East Arnhem
 2010 – Alice Springs
 2009 – Darwin Dingoes
 2008 – Alice Springs
 2007 – Brahmans
 2006 – Ironsides (Army)
 2005 – Full Damage
 2004 – Dragons Green
 2003 – Swampdogs
 2002 – Singapore Cricket Club
 2001 – Poddles
 2000 – Poddles
 1999 – Lions
 1998 – Dragons
 1997 – Aussie Signs
 1996 – Airport Hotel Cougars
 1995 – Pints
 1994 – RSL Dragons
 1993 – Lions
 1992 – Pandata Panthers
 1991 – Darwin U21
 1990 – Cougars

Gecko Shield competition
 2022 – South Darwin
 2021 – not contested
 2020 – not contested
 2019 – Central Crewsaders
 2018 – Northern NSW Hogs
 2017 – Honkers (Aust)
 2016 – East Arnhem
 2015 – Central Crusaderz
 2014 – University
 2013 – South Darwin
 2012 – Groote Eylandt
 2011 – Palmerston
 2010 – Brahmans Boks
 2009 – Groote Eylandt
 2008 – Groote Eylandt

Player of the tournament
 2020 – not contested
 2019 – Abele Atunaisa (Legends Tabadamu)
 2018 – Celia Dranes (France Development women)

Jabiru Women's Cup competition
 2021 – Classic Wallaroos/1st Nations Development
 2021 – Reds/Queensland Academy of Sport
 2020 – not contested
 2019 – Miwatj/Festerville Industries Stallions
 2018 – France Development
 2017 – Australian Women's Development VII 
 2016 – Tribe 7s 
 2015 – Tribe 7s (invitational team – Aust.)
 2014 – Hong Kong
 2013 – Sunnybank
 2012 – Aussie Pearls
 2011 – Eastsyde 7's
 2010 – Queensland
 2009 – Zonnators
 2008 – Arrongatahi NZ
 2007 – Northern Territory Invitations
 2004 – University Pirates
 2003 – University Pirates
 2002 – Hong Kong
 2001 – Casuarina
 2000 – Pints Dragons
 1999 – NTIS
 1998 – Pints Dragons
 1997 – University Pirates
 1996 – Casuarina Cougars
 1995 – Palmerston Sweethearts

Jacana Women's Plate competition
 2022 – not contested
 2021 – not contested
 2020 – not contested
 2019 – University Pirates
 2018 – not contested
 2017 – Central Queensland Dingoes
 2016 – not contested
 2015 –  Sydney University

References

External links
Hottest7s.com Official Website
Hottest 7s in the World on Facebook.com
Hottest 7s in the World on ur7s.com (Ultimate Rugby Sevens)

Rugby sevens competitions in Australia
Rugby union in the Northern Territory
Sport in Darwin, Northern Territory
Recurring sporting events established in 1989
1989 establishments in Australia